The Soviet Class A Second Group (Soviet football championship (Class A Second Group)) was the second and for a season third highest division of Soviet football, below the Soviet Class A First Group. The league was formed in 1963 by splitting away from the Class A and forcing the Class B of the Soviet football championship to downgrade to the third tier. 

In 1970 the Soviet Class A was expanded even further adding additional tier to the top and downgrading the Soviet Class A Second Group to the third tier. In 1971 it was replaced with the Soviet Second League.

Winners

Second tier

Third tier

2
Defunct second level football leagues in Europe
Defunct third level football leagues in Europe
Sports leagues established in 1963
Sports leagues disestablished in 1970
1963 establishments in the Soviet Union
1970 disestablishments in the Soviet Union